Elisha Huntington (April 9, 1796 – December 13, 1865) was an American physician and politician who served as the Mayor of Lowell, Massachusetts and as the 19th Lieutenant Governor for the Commonwealth of Massachusetts from 1853 to 1854.

Early life
Huntington was born in Topsfield, Massachusetts on  July 23, 1798 to Rev. Asahel and Alethea (Lord) Huntington. Huntington was the brother of Salem, Massachusetts mayor Asahel Huntington.

He was graduated at Dartmouth College in 1815 and from Yale Medical School in 1823. Commencing his professional life at Lowell in 1824, two years before the incorporation of that city, he was identified for the last quarter of a century with its growth and improvement, and was eight times elected mayor. In 1853 he was Lieutenant Governor of Massachusetts. He was also at one time president of the Massachusetts Medical Society, and from 1860 to 1365 an overseer of Harvard College.
He married in 1825, Miss Hannah Hinckley, of Marblehead, who died in 1859. They had five children.

Notes

External links
New York Times death notice

1796 births
1865 deaths
People from Topsfield, Massachusetts
Dartmouth College alumni
Yale University alumni
Physicians from Massachusetts
Massachusetts city council members
Mayors of Lowell, Massachusetts
Lieutenant Governors of Massachusetts
Massachusetts Whigs
19th-century American politicians